is a 1999 survival horror game developed by Team Silent and published by Konami. The first installment in the video game series Silent Hill, the game was released from February to July, originally for the PlayStation. Silent Hill uses a third-person view, with real-time rendering of 3D environments. To mitigate limitations of the console hardware, developers liberally used fog and darkness to muddle the graphics. Unlike earlier survival horror games that focused on protagonists with combat training, the player character of Silent Hill is an "everyman".

The game follows Harry Mason as he searches for his missing adopted daughter in the eponymous fictional American town of Silent Hill; stumbling upon a cult conducting a ritual to revive a deity it worships, he discovers her true origin. Five game endings are possible, depending on actions taken by the player, including one joke ending.

Silent Hill received positive reviews from critics on its release and was commercially successful. It is considered by many to be one of the greatest video games ever made, as well as a defining title in the survival horror genre, as it moved away from B movie horror elements toward a more psychological horror style, emphasizing atmosphere. Various adaptations of Silent Hill have been released, including a 2001 visual novel, the 2006 feature film Silent Hill, and a 2009 reimagining of the game, titled Silent Hill: Shattered Memories. The game was followed by Silent Hill 2 in 2001, and a direct sequel, Silent Hill 3, in 2003.

Gameplay

The objective of the player is to guide main protagonist and player character Harry Mason through a monster-filled town as he searches for his lost daughter, Cheryl. Silent Hills gameplay consists of combat, exploration, and puzzle-solving. The game uses a third-person view, with the camera occasionally switching to other angles for dramatic effect, in pre-scripted areas. This is a change from older survival horror games, which constantly shifted through a variety of camera angles. Because Silent Hill has no heads-up display, the player must consult a separate menu to check Harry's "health". If a DualShock controller is used, a heart beat rhythm can be felt signifying that the player is at low health.

Harry confronts monsters in each area with both melee weapons and firearms. An ordinary man, Harry cannot sustain many blows from enemies, and gasps for breath after sprinting. His inexperience in handling firearms means that his aim, and therefore the player's targeting of enemies, is often unsteady. A portable radio collected early in the game alerts Harry to the presence of nearby creatures with bursts of static.

The player can locate and collect maps of each area, stylistically similar to tourist maps. Accessible from the menu and readable only when sufficient light is present, each map is marked with places of interest. Visibility is mostly low due to fog and darkness; the latter is prevalent in the "Otherworld". The player locates a pocket-size flashlight early in the game, but the light beam illuminates only a few feet. Navigating through Silent Hill requires the player to find keys and solve puzzles.

Plot 
Silent Hill opens with Harry Mason's drive to the titular town with his adopted daughter Cheryl for a vacation. At the town's edge, he swerves to avoid hitting a girl in the road, and as a result, he crashes and loses consciousness. Waking up in town, he realizes that Cheryl is missing and sets out to look for her. The town is deserted and foggy, with snow falling out of season, and he begins to experience bouts of unconsciousness and encounters with hostile creatures. During his exploration of the town, he meets Cybil Bennett, a police officer from the neighboring town who is investigating the mysterious occurrences. Dahlia Gillespie, a cultist, gifts him the Flauros, a charm which she claims can counteract the darkness spreading through the town. In the town's hospital, he encounters its director, Dr. Michael Kaufmann, bewildered by the sudden changes in the town, and discovers a frightened, amnesiac nurse, Lisa Garland, hiding in one of the rooms.

Harry can later rescue Kaufmann from a monster, discover evidence of Kaufmann's role in the local drug trafficking, and stumble upon Kaufmann's hidden bottle of aglaophotis, a supernatural liquid that can exorcise demons. Harry comes to believe that a darkness is transforming the town into someone's nightmare, which is why the inhabitants have mostly disappeared. Dahlia urges him to stop "the demon" responsible for it—the girl in the road who appears to him sporadically—or Cheryl will die. Continuing his search, Harry finds himself drawn into a fight with Cybil, who has become the host to a supernatural parasite; the player can choose to save her. The next time Harry sees the girl, the Flauros activates and neutralizes her telekinetic powers. Dahlia then appears and reveals that she manipulated Harry into catching the girl—an apparition of her daughter, Alessa.

Harry then awakens in the hospital again, next to Lisa. Lisa explains that she experienced a sense of déjà vu while in the basement, and when he finds her again, she despairs that she is "the same as them". She pleads with Harry to save her, but Harry pushes her away and blood starts to run down her face; horrified, he flees. Her diary reveals that she nursed Alessa during a secret, forced hospitalization. Alessa's never-healing wounds terrified her, as she fell deeper into a drug addiction fueled by Kaufmann. Finding Dahlia with Alessa's defeated apparition and charred body, Harry demands to know Cheryl's whereabouts: he discovers that seven years earlier Dahlia conducted a ritual to force Alessa to birth the cult's deity; Alessa sustained significant burns when fire used in the ritual escalated into a conflagration, but survived because her status as vessel rendered her immortal, while her mental resistance to the ritual caused her soul to be bisected, preventing the birth. One half manifested as the infant Cheryl, whom Harry and his wife adopted. Dahlia then casts a spell to lure Cheryl back, while Alessa was imprisoned within the hospital, enduring unceasing agony as a result of her injuries. With Alessa's plan thwarted and her soul rejoined, the deity is revived and possesses her.

Endings
Five different endings are available, dependent on the player's previous actions:

 In the "Bad" ending, the deity merges with Alessa and electrocutes Dahlia before attacking Harry. He defeats it, and Cheryl's voice thanks him for freeing her. Overcome by grief, Harry collapses, and the next scene is that of his corpse in his wrecked car, implying that the entire game was a dying dream.
 The "Bad +" ending concludes with Harry and Cybil fleeing instead after the deity's demise.
 In the "Good" ending, Kaufmann, now feeling betrayed by Dahlia, demands that she restore the town to normal and uses aglaophotis to exorcise the deity out of Alessa. Harry defeats the deity, and Alessa gives him an infant, the reincarnation of herself and Cheryl. She then helps him escape from her nightmare realm.
 In the "Good +" ending, Harry escapes with Cybil and the baby. In both "Good" endings, a bloody and vengeful Lisa prevents Kaufmann from escaping with Harry. 
 The "Joke" ending features extraterrestrials abducting Harry.

Development

Design
Development of Silent Hill started in September 1996. The game was created by Team Silent, a group of staff members within the Konami Computer Entertainment Tokyo studio. Konami sought to produce a game that would be successful in the United States. For this reason, a Hollywood-like atmosphere was used for Silent Hill. According to composer Akira Yamaoka, the developers did not know how to proceed with the Silent Hill project, either. As the time passed, the personnel and management of Konami lost their faith in the game, and the members of Team Silent increasingly felt like outsiders. Despite the profit-oriented approach of the parent company, however, the developers of Silent Hill had much artistic freedom because the game was still produced as in the era of lower-budget 2D titles. Eventually, the development staff decided to ignore the limits of Konami's initial plan, and to make Silent Hill a game that would appeal to the emotions of players instead.

For this purpose, the team introduced a "fear of the unknown" as a psychological type of horror. The plot was made vague and occasionally contradictory to leave its true meaning in the dark, and to make players reflect upon unexplained parts. Director Keiichiro Toyama created the game's scenario, while programmer Hiroyuki Owaku wrote the text for the riddles. Toyama did not have much experience of horror movies but was interested in UFOs, the occult and David Lynch movies which influenced the game's development. Toyama questioned Konami's decision to appoint him as director, as he had never been one prior to Silent Hill.

The localization company Latina International translated the script into English. The town of Silent Hill is an interpretation of a small American community as imagined by the Japanese team. It was based on Western literature and films, as well as on depictions of American towns in European and Russian culture. The game's joke ending came out of a suggestion box created to find alternative reasons for the occurrences in Silent Hill.

Artist Takayoshi Sato corrected inconsistencies in the plot, and designed the game's cast of characters. As a young employee, Sato was initially restricted to basic tasks such as font design and file sorting. He also created 3D demos and presentations, and taught older staff members the fundamentals of 3D modeling. However, he was not credited for this work as he did not have as much respect within Konami as older employees. Sato eventually approached the company's higher-ups with a short demo movie he had rendered, and threatened to withhold this technical knowledge from other staff members if he was not assigned to 3D work. As a consequence, his superior had to give in to his demand, and he was allowed to do character designs. Instead of relying on illustrations, Sato conceived the characters of Silent Hill while creating their computer-generated models. He gave each their own distinctive characteristics, but made Harry almost completely neutral as he wanted to avoid forcing interpretations of the game on the players. Creating the skull shapes for the faces of the American cast was difficult because he had no Caucasian co-workers to use for reference. Although Sato was largely responsible for the game's cinematics and characters at this point, his superior still did not want to fully credit his work, and intended to assign a visual supervisor to him. To prevent this from happening, Sato volunteered to create the full-motion videos of Silent Hill by himself. Over the course of two and a half years, he lived in the development team's office, as he had to render the scenes with the approximately 150 Unix-based computers of his coworkers after they left work at the end of a day.

Sato estimated the game's budget was lower than the cost of Japan's biggest games at the time. He said the development team intended to make Silent Hill a masterpiece rather than a traditional sales-oriented game, and that they opted for an engaging story, which would persist over time—similar to successful literature. The game debuted at the 1998 Electronic Entertainment Expo in Atlanta, Georgia, United States, where the presentations of movies and in-game scenes garnered applause from the audience. This favorable reception persuaded Konami to allot more personnel and public relation initiatives to the project. Konami later showcased Silent Hill at the European Computer Trade Show in London, and included a demo with its stealth game Metal Gear Solid in Japan.

The names and designs of some Silent Hill creatures and puzzles are based on books enjoyed by the character of Alessa, including The Lost World by Arthur Conan Doyle and Lewis Carroll's Alice's Adventures in Wonderland. The game contains several real-life references, particularly in characters' names. Cheryl Mason's first name is based on actress Sheryl Lee's first name, and Lisa Garland's surname is taken from actress Judy Garland. "Michael Kaufmann" is a combination of Troma Studios producers Michael Herz's and Lloyd Kaufmann's first name and surname, respectively. Alessa's original name was "Asia", and Dahlia's was "Daria", based on the first names of actresses Asia Argento and Daria Nicolodi—Argento's mother. Harry's name was originally "Humbert", and Cheryl's was "Dolores", in reference to the protagonist and title character of Vladimir Nabokov's novel Lolita. The American staff altered these names, as they considered them too uncommon. Fictitious religious items appearing in the game have used various religions as a basis: the evil spirit-dispelling substance Aglaophotis, which is said to be made from a medicinal herb, is based on a herb of similar name and nature in the Kabbalah (Jewish mysticism); the "Seal of Metatron" (also referred to by Dahlia as the "Mark of Samael") references the angels Metatron and Samael, respectively; and the name of the "Flauros" was taken from the eponymous demon appearing in the Lemegeton, a book on magic said to have been compiled by writings of King Solomon. Certain items and doors in the "nowhere" dimension of the game were given names based on occult elements in order to symbolize magical traits of Dahlia. The names of these doors were taken from the names of the angels Ophiel, Hagith, Phaleg, and Bethor, who appear in a medieval book of black magic and are supposed to rule over planets. This motif of giving names that suggest planets was used to signify that "a deeper part of the realm of Alessa's mind is being entered", according to Owaku.

Music

The soundtrack for Silent Hill was composed by sound director Akira Yamaoka, who requested to join the development staff after the original musician had left. In addition to the music, he was in charge of tasks such as sound effect creation and audio mastering. Yamaoka did not watch game scenes, but created the music independently from its visuals. The style of his compositions was influenced by Twin Peaks composer Angelo Badalamenti. To differentiate Silent Hill from other games as much as possible, and to give it a cold and rusty feel, Yamaoka opted for industrial music. When he presented his musical pieces to the other staff members for the first time, they misinterpreted their sound as a game bug. Yamaoka had to explain that this noise was intended for the music, and the team only withdrew their initial objection after he elaborated on his reasons for choosing this style.

On March 5, 1999, the album Silent Hill Original Soundtracks was released in Japan. The 41st track on the CD, the ending theme "Esperándote", was composed by Rika Muranaka. After Yamaoka had approached her to create a piece of music for the game, she suggested the use of bandoneóns, violins, and a Spanish-speaking singer. It was decided to make the song a tango, and Muranaka composed the melody for the English lyrics she had conceived. When she arrived in Buenos Aires, Argentina, to record the translated Spanish lyrics with Argentine singer Vanesa Quiroz, Muranaka realized that the syllables did not match the melodic line any more, and she had to recompose it in five minutes.

On October 29, 2013, Perseverance Records released a "Best Of" album, which features 16 newly interpreted instrumental tracks composed by Akira Yamaoka and arranged and performed by Edgar Rothermich. The 17th track on the album is the ballad "I Want Love" performed by Romina Arena.

Release
Silent Hill was released for the PlayStation in 1999, from February to July in North America, Japan, and Europe. It was included in the Japanese Silent Hill Complete Set in 2006. Silent Hill became available for download from the European PlayStation Network store of the PlayStation 3 and the PlayStation Portable on March 19, 2009. Two days later, the game was removed due to "unforeseen circumstances". On September 10, Silent Hill was released on the North American PlayStation Network. It was re-released on the European PlayStation Network on October 26, 2011.

Adaptations

A radically altered version of Silent Hill was released for the Game Boy Advance. Titled Play Novel: Silent Hill and released only in Japan in 2001, it is a gamebook-style visual novel. It contains a retelling of Silent Hills story through text-based gameplay, with the player occasionally confronted with questions concerning what direction to take the character, as well as the puzzles, which are a major part of Silent Hills gameplay. After completing the game once, the player has the option of playing as Cybil in a second scenario, with a third made available for download as a paid-DLC on the  device, once the second scenario has been completed. When the game was exhibited, Western critics were unimpressed, and criticized the lack of any soundtrack as severely detracting from the "horror" factor of the game.

A film adaptation, also titled Silent Hill, was released on April 21, 2006. The film, directed by Christophe Gans, was based loosely on the game, incorporating elements from Silent Hill 2, 3, and 4. Gans replaced Harry Mason with a female main protagonist, Rose Da Silva, because he felt Harry had many qualities typically perceived as feminine.
When designing the film's visual elements, Gans was influenced by fellow directors Michael Mann, David Lynch, and David Cronenberg. The film's soundtrack includes music composed by Yamaoka. Although critical reaction was mostly negative, the film was a financial success and was praised by fans, especially for its visuals.

A "reimagining" of Silent Hill, titled Silent Hill: Shattered Memories, was developed by Climax Studios and published by Konami Digital Entertainment. The game was released on December 8, 2009, for the Wii and on January 19, 2010, for the PlayStation 2 and the PlayStation Portable, to mostly positive reviews. Although it retains the premise of a man's search for his missing daughter, Shattered Memories branches off into a different plot with altered characters. It features psychological profiling which alters various in-game elements depending on the player's response to questions in therapy, lacks the combat of Silent Hill, and replaces the "Otherworld" with a series of chase sequences through an alternate frozen version of the town.

Reception and legacy

Silent Hill received "generally favorable reviews" at the review aggregate website Metacritic. The game sold over two million copies, which gained Silent Hill a place in the American PlayStation Greatest Hits budget releases. In November 1999, the Verband der Unterhaltungssoftware Deutschland (VUD) gave Silent Hill a "Gold" award, indicating sales of at least 100,000 units across Germany, Austria and Switzerland.

Silent Hill has been compared to the Resident Evil series of survival horror video games. Bobba Fatt of GamePro labeled Silent Hill a "shameless but slick Resident Evil clone", while Edge described it as "a near-perfect sim nightmare". Others felt that Silent Hill was Konami's answer to the Resident Evil series in that, while they noted a similarity, Silent Hill utilized a different form of horror to induce fear, attempting to form a disturbing atmosphere for the player, in contrast to the visceral scares and action-oriented approach of Resident Evil. Adding to the atmosphere was the audio, which was well received; Billy Matjiunis of TVG described the ambient music as "engrossing"; a reviewer for Game Revolution also praised the audio, commenting that the sound and music will set players on edge. AllGame editor Michael L. House praised Silent Hill, describing it as "a truly magnificent work of art" and "a genuinely terrifying experience combined with a unique, gripping story and immersive atmosphere". Less well-received was the voice acting which, although some reviewers remarked it was better than that found in the Resident Evil series, was found poor overall by reviewers, and accompanied by pauses between lines that served to spoil the atmosphere.

Reviewers noted that Silent Hill used real-time 3D environments, in contrast to the pre-rendered environments found in Resident Evil. Fog and darkness were heavily used to disguise the limitations of the hardware. Along with the grainy textures—also from hardware limitations—most reviewers felt that these factors actually worked in the game's favor; Francesca Reyes of IGN described it as "adding to the atmosphere of dilapidation and decay". In using 3D environments, however, controls became an issue, and in "tougher" areas, maneuverability became "an exercise in frustration".

Edge selected it as runner-up for the Gameplay Innovation award. They stated that, whereas other games attempted to hide the PlayStation's visual inadequecies, Konami used its draw-distance deficiency to chilling effect by draping atmospheric fog about the place.

The game's popularity as the first in the series was further recognized long after its release; a list of the best PS games of all time by IGN in 2000 listed it as the 14th-best PS game, while a 2005 article by GameSpy detailing the best PS games listed Silent Hill as the 15th-best game produced for the console. A GameTrailers video feature in 2006 ranked Silent Hill as number one in its list of the top ten scariest games of all time. In 2005, the game was credited for moving the survival horror genre away from B movie horror elements to the psychological style seen in art house or Japanese horror films, due to the game's emphasis on a disturbing atmosphere rather than visceral horror. In November 2012, Time named it one of the 100 greatest video games of all time.

Notes

References

External links
 

1999 video games
Censored video games
Everyman
Game Boy Advance games
1990s horror video games
Konami games
PlayStation (console) games
PlayStation Network games
Psychological horror games
Silent Hill games
Single-player video games
Survival video games
Video games adapted into comics
Video games adapted into films
Video games adapted into novels
Video games scored by Akira Yamaoka
Video games set in amusement parks
Video games set in Maine
Video games with alternate endings
Video games about cults
Visual novels
Works about vacationing
Video games developed in Japan